Egidijus Jarašiūnas (born October 9, 1952 in Kelmė district municipality) is a Lithuanian lawyer, signatory of the Act of the Re-Establishment of the State of Lithuania. He was a judge of the Constitutional Court of Lithuania from 1996 to 2005. Since 2007 he is a dean of Faculty of Law at Mykolas Romeris University.

See also

List of members of the European Court of Justice

References

  Egidijus Jarašiūnas. Seimas of the Republic of Lithuania.
 News and Events. Mykolas Romeris University.

Living people
1952 births
Law school deans
Lithuanian scholars of constitutional law
Judges of the Constitutional Court of Lithuania
European Court of Justice judges
Members of the Seimas
People from Kelmė
Lithuanian academic administrators
20th-century Lithuanian lawyers
21st-century Lithuanian lawyers
21st-century Lithuanian educators
Lithuanian judges of international courts and tribunals
Academic staff of Mykolas Romeris University
Signatories of the Act of the Re-Establishment of the State of Lithuania